The prefix pseudo- (from Greek ψευδής, pseudes, "false") is used to mark something that superficially appears to be (or behaves like) one thing, but is something else. Subject to context, pseudo may connote coincidence, imitation, intentional deception, or a combination thereof.

 In scholarship and studies, pseudo-scholarship refers to material that is presented as, but is not, the product of rigorous and objective study or research. Examples:
Pseudoarchaeology
 Pseudohistory
 Pseudolinguistics 
 Pseudoscientific language comparison
 Folk linguistics
 Pseudomathematics
 Pseudophilosophy
 Pseudoscience
 In biology and botany, the prefix 'pseudo' is used to indicate a species with a coincidental visual similarity to another genus. For example, Iris pseudacorus is known as 'pseudacorus' for having leaves similar to those of Acorus calamus. In biology, coincidental similarity is not the same as mimicry.
 In literary studies, the prefix 'pseudo-' is used to indicate false attribution of authorship. For example, Pseudo-Aristotle is the name given to persons who falsely wrote under the name of Aristotle to give their own ideas greater credibility. The false ascription of authorship is called pseudepigraphy, and the works themselves are called pseudepigrapha. The 'pseudo-' prefix is not used for pseudonyms, false names used to hide one's true identity.
 In linguistics, the prefix 'pseudo-' is also applied to certain categories of loanwords in which words are used in a way that does not coincide with the way the word is used in the original language. For example, the English word handy has been adopted in colloquial German as the term for a mobile/cell phone. This is known as a pseudo-anglicism.
 In historiography, the prefix 'pseudo' is also applied to imposters or false claimants to a throne, for example Pseudo-Nero.
 In pharmacology, the 'pseudo' prefix is also used to identify an alternate form of a pharmacological compound. For example, pseudoephedrine.
 In the study of art, the 'pseudo' prefix is applied to an imitation of the artistic style of a different cultural background (in contradistinction to neo-, the imitation of a style of an earlier epoch). For example, Pseudo-Kufic, Pseudo-Cyrillic, Pseudo-Chalcidian, pseudo-naïve.
 In geology and geography, the 'pseudo' prefix is also used for topographical formations that superficially appear to have been formed by one process, but were formed by another. For example, pseudo-atoll.
 In mathematics, the 'pseudo' prefix is also applied to items that are similar to (or mathematically behave like) something else, but not exactly that. For example, pseudo-arcs, pseudorandomness, pseudoprime.
 In networking, a pseudowire is a point-to-point connection that emulates a physical wire between two locations. 
 In anthropology, the 'pseudo' prefix is applied to cultural representation, most commonly related to indigenous cultures. A pseudo-culture is a form of cultural expression that was designed for monetary gain, and helps to further erode cultural identity of natives. It strays from authentic traditions and provides a false representation of a culture. 
As a term, "pseudo" may refer to someone with pseudoachondroplasia, a form of dwarfism.

See also

Prefixes
Biological nomenclature